Interceptor Corporation was a US firm founded in Norman, Oklahoma to develop and market a turboprop-powered version of the Meyers 200, known as the Interceptor 400. In the early 1970s, the market was not yet ready for a turboprop-powered single-engine aircraft, and the company failed. Rights to all aircraft were eventually acquired by Prop-Jets Inc in 1983.

Defunct aircraft manufacturers of the United States
Defunct manufacturing companies based in Oklahoma